Lyctocoris stalii is a species of true bug in the family Lyctocoridae. It is found in North America.

References

Further reading

 

Cimicomorpha
Lyctocoridae
Articles created by Qbugbot
Insects described in 1871